Davy is Coconut Records' 2009 second release. The album is, as was Nighttiming, the product of Jason Schwartzman, who wrote all of the songs and performs the majority of the instruments.

The first official single for the album was "Microphone."  The song was also used in the 2012 film LOL, starring Miley Cyrus and subsequently featured on the soundtrack. A portion of "Any Fun" is in a teaser video on the Coconut Records MySpace page. The track listing and album art first appeared on the independent online music store Amie Street.

Like Nighttiming, the CD pressing of Davy contains demo and alternate versions of the album's songs after the final track.

The songs "Wires" and "I Am Young" were featured on the Funny People original soundtrack.

Two music videos were made for this album; "Microphone" and "Any Fun."

Cover art
The album's artwork was inspired by the book cover of the Penguin Books' edition of Aldous Huxley's novel Island.

Track listing
All songs written by Jason Schwartzman.
 "Microphone" – 2:53
 "Drummer" – 2:55
 "Any Fun" – 2:56
 "Saint Jerome" – 2:49
 "Courtyard" – 2:14
 "Wandering Around" – 2:41
 "The Summer" – 2:45
 "I Am Young" – 3:11
 "Wires" – 2:35
 "Is This Sound Okay?" – 3:07

Bonus track listing
 (Silence)
 "Untitled"
 "Drummer (Alternate Version)"
 "Any Fun (Alternate Instrumental Version)"
 "Saint Jerome (Alternate Version)"
 "Courtyard (Alternate Version)"
 "Courtyard (Alternate Instrumental Version)"
 "Wandering Around (Alternate Version)"
 "Wandering Around (Alternate Version 2)"
 "The Summer (Alternate Version)"
 "I Am Young (Alternate Version)"
 "I Am Young (Alternate 'Let It Go' Version)"
 "Wires (Alternate Version)"

References

External links
Official site
Coconut Records at Rhapsody
Coconut Records at Myspace
Coconut Records at Amiestreet.com

Jason Schwartzman albums
2009 albums